Lone Mountain is a mountain located in Ulster County, New York. 
The mountain is part of the Catskill Mountains.
Lone Mountain is flanked to the southwest by Table Mountain, and to the east by Rocky Mountain.

The southeast side of Lone Mountain drains into Rondout Creek, thence into the Hudson River, and into New York Bay. 
The west side of Lone Mtn. drains into Donovan Brook, thence into the East Branch of the Neversink River, the Delaware River, and into Delaware Bay. 
The north side of Lone Mtn. drains into the East Branch of the Neversink.

Lone Mountain is within the Slide Mountain Wilderness of New York's Catskill State Park.

See also 
 List of mountains in New York

References

External links 
  Catskill 3500 Club: Lone Mountain

Catskill High Peaks
Mountains of Ulster County, New York
Mountains of New York (state)